Surmann is a German surname. Notable people with the surname include:

 Hartmut Surmann (born 1963), German electric technician and information scientist
 Mathias Surmann (born 1974), German football player

See also
 Surman

German-language surnames
de:Suhrmann